Edward Andrews (1914–1985) was an American actor.

Edward, Ed or Eddie Andrews may also refer to:
E. Wyllys Andrews IV (1916–1971), American archaeologist and Mayanist scholar
Punch Andrews, real name Edward Andrews, music producer and manager
Eddie Andrews (born 1977), South African rugby union player
Edward Deming Andrews (1894–1964), American historian and authority on the Shakers
Edward Andrews (High Sheriff of Rutland)
Edward Gayer Andrews (1825–1907), Bishop of the Methodist Episcopal Church
Edward Pope Andrews (born 1908), missing person from Chicago. 
Edward William Andrews (1812–1877), newspaper editor in the Colony of South Australia
Ed Andrews (1859–1934), baseball player
Ed Andrews (blues musician) ( 1920s), American blues musician

See also
Ned G. Andrews, winner of 67th Scripps National Spelling Bee
Edmund Andrews (disambiguation)